In Book V of Ovid's mock-epic Metamorphoses, Athis is a young demigod of outstanding beauty from India, son of Limnaee, a nymph of the Ganges.

Mythology 
Athis was follower of Phineus. During a quarrel between Perseus and Phineus, Perseus killed Athis, who was preparing to shoot his bow, with a log that had been smoldering in the middle of the altar. The Assyrian Lycabas, who Ovid says is Athis' closest friend or, most probably, his lover, wept for his fallen companion, and attempted to avenge him, shooting an arrow at Perseus from Athis's bow. However, Perseus avoided the arrow, and Lycabas, too, fell.

Inspiration 
Classical scholar Alison Keith suggests that Athis' death was modelled on Corynaeus' killing of Ebysus after throwing a burning firebrand at him taken from an altar, in Vergil's Aeneid.

See also
 Boast of Cassiopeia

Note

References 

 Publius Ovidius Naso, Metamorphoses translated by Brookes More (1859-1942). Boston, Cornhill Publishing Co. 1922. Online version at the Perseus Digital Library.
 Publius Ovidius Naso, Metamorphoses. Hugo Magnus. Gotha (Germany). Friedr. Andr. Perthes. 1892. Latin text available at the Perseus Digital Library.

External links

Demigods in classical mythology
Indian characters in Greek mythology
Metamorphoses characters
Heroes in mythology and legend
Mythological Greek archers
LGBT themes in Greek mythology